Sinimäe is a small borough in Narva-Jõesuu, Ida-Viru County in northeastern Estonia. At the 2011 Census, the settlement's population was 319, of which the Estonians were 100 (31.3%).

Before 1977, Sinimäe was regarded as a village.

In September 1944, the village was destroyed during a fierce battle between the Red Army and its opponents including Wehrmacht and Waffen-SS troops.

See also
 Sinimäed Hills
 Battle of Tannenberg Line

References

Villages in Ida-Viru County
Boroughs and small boroughs in Estonia